"Gossip Folks" is a song by American rapper Missy Elliott featuring Ludacris. The song appears on Elliott's fourth studio album, Under Construction (2002), and was released as the album's second single on December 9, 2002. It peaked at number eight on the Billboard Hot 100, number one on the Billboard Dance Club Songs chart, and number nine in the United Kingdom.

Background
The song is Missy's response to different rumors about her (e.g., her sexual orientation, her weight), and essentially tells those who spread these rumors to mind their own business. The refrain of "Gossip Folks" samples the 1981 song "Double Dutch Bus" by Frankie Smith.

Music video
The music video for "Gossip Folks" was directed by Dave Meyers. In the beginning Elliott is walking through the hallway when students start announcing her entrance and begin to start rumors about her.

As Missy's verse starts, Missy and the students begin dancing through the chorus. The second verse starts in the cafeteria where Missy has her group of students have a food fight with another group. Also in the cafeteria are Tweet, Eve, and Trina impressing while sitting on a cafeteria table.

In the middle of the video a clip of "Funky Fresh Dressed" featuring Ms. Jade was played. The "Funky Fresh Dressed" segment of the video features Elliott and Ms. Jade with their green shades in a classroom. Missy begins to aggravate the teacher Faizon Love while Ms. Jade takes over the class with a yardstick as a symbol of power. Ludacris's verse begins directly after the "Funky Fresh Dressed" segment. He appears to be the principal.

The bus driver who appears in the last 10 seconds is Darryl McDaniels (DMC of Run-DMC). Toward the end of the video a mural dedicated to the late R&B/hip hop stars Aaliyah (1979–2001), Lisa Lopes (1971–2002), and Jam Master Jay (1965–2002) is shown. The video features several young dancers, including Monica Parales of former girl group School Gyrls and Alyson Stoner of The JammX Kids. Monica Parales auditioned for the role of Lead Kid Dancer in Work It (Missy Elliott song), but lost the role to Alyson Stoner. Monica eventually co-starred with Alyson in "Gossip Folks" and I'm Really Hot. The music video also stars dancer and actress Jenna Dewan from Step Up.

Tributes in the end of the video
 Aaliyah Dana Haughton (born January 16, 1979 – died August 25, 2001) – plane accident
 Lisa Nicole Lopes (born May 27, 1971 – died April 25, 2002) – car accident
 Jason William Mizell (born January 21, 1965 – died October 30, 2002) – murdered

Track listings

US 12-inch single
A1. "Gossip Folks" (amended version)
A2. "Gossip Folks" (album version)
B1. "Gossip Folks" (instrumental)
B2. "Gossip Folks" (a cappella)
B3. "Gossip Folks" (TV track)

UK CD single
 "Gossip Folks" (Fatboy Slim radio remix) – 3:31
 "Gossip Folks" (Fatboy Slim remix) – 6:42
 "Gossip Folks" (original version) – 3:54
 "Gossip Folks" (Fatboy Slim remix video)

UK 12-inch single
A. "Gossip Folks" (Fatboy Slim remix) – 6:42
B. "Gossip Folks" (original version) – 3:54

European CD single 1
 "Gossip Folks" (Fatboy Slim remix) – 6:42
 "Gossip Folks" (original version) – 3:54

European CD single 2
 "Gossip Folks" (Mousse T. & Royal Garden remix radio) – 3:37
 "Gossip Folks" (Fatboy Slim remix) – 6:42

Australian CD single
 "Gossip Folks" (Fatboy Slim radio remix) – 3:31
 "Gossip Folks" (Fatboy Slim remix) – 6:42
 "Gossip Folks" (original version) – 3:54
 "Gossip Folks" (Mousse T.'s original alternative) – 3:47
 "Gossip Folks" (Mousse T.'s Pogo remix extended) – 5:04
 "Gossip Folks" (Mousse T. & Royal Garden remix extended) – 5:19
 "Gossip Folks" (original video)

Charts

Weekly charts

Year-end charts

Release history

References

2002 singles
2002 songs
Ludacris songs
Missy Elliott songs
Music videos directed by Dave Meyers (director)
Song recordings produced by Timbaland
Songs written by Ludacris
Songs written by Missy Elliott
Songs written by Timbaland